Govinda Rao Harishankar, (India, June 10, 1958 in Chennai – February 11, 2002 in Chennai) was an Indian player of the kanjira,  Khanjira or Khanjari, a tambourine-like frame drum used in the Carnatic music of South India. He is the only kanjira player to be awarded the Sangeet Natak Akademi Award, the highest national recognition given to performing artists.

Profile 
Harishankar received his initial training under his father Govinda Rao. (The Malayalam film singer and classical vocalist Govind Rao was a different person.) He later learnt under Ramanathapuram C. S. Murugabhoopathy and then under Palghat Mani Iyer. He was a staff artist of the All India Radio, Chennai. Some of his best performances in albums were with the Sruthilaya group along with Karaikudi R Mani on the mridangam, T V Vasan on the ghatam, and Srirangam Kannan on the morsing. He performed on several albums including Laya Chithra, Sruthilaya, and Grand Finale.  He is considered by many as the greatest kanjira performer to date. 'Harishankar style of Kanjira playing' has become the benchmark for Kanjira playing which been hugely followed & adapted by all Kanjira players worldwide. 

He had albinism.

G. Harishankar's main disciples are C. P. Vyasa Vittala, Bangalore Amrit & Nerkunam Sankar. They are performing in concerts regularly. They have been training many students & spreading the tradition to the next generations.

References

1958 births
2002 deaths
Kanjira players
Indian percussionists
People with albinism
20th-century Indian musicians
20th-century drummers
Recipients of the Sangeet Natak Akademi Award